John B. Barrow (October 31, 1935 – February 17, 2015) was an American college and professional football player who was an offensive and defensive tackle in the Canadian Football League (CFL) for fourteen seasons in the 1950s, 1960s and 1970s.  Barrow played college football for the University of Florida, and was recognized as an All-American.  Thereafter, he played professionally for the Hamilton Tiger-Cats of the CFL, and was later inducted into the Canadian Football Hall of Fame.

Early years 

Barrow was born in Delray Beach, Florida, in 1935.  He attended the University of Florida in Gainesville, Florida, where he was an offensive and defensive lineman for coach Bob Woodruff's Florida Gators football team from 1954 to 1956.  As a senior in 1956, he was a first-team All-Southeastern Conference (SEC) selection, a Football Writers Association of America first-team All-American, and the Gators' team captain.  Barrow was later inducted into the University of Florida Athletic Hall of Fame as a "Gator Great."

Professional career 

The Detroit Lions of the National Football League (NFL) selected Barrow in the fifth round (59th pick overall) of the 1957 NFL Draft, but he opted to play in the CFL instead. Barrow was a member of four Grey Cup-winning Tiger-Cats teams (1957, 1963, 1965, 1967), and played in five other Grey Cup championship games (1958, 1959, 1961, 1962, 1964).

He was inducted into the Canadian Football Hall of Fame in 1976, and was voted one of the CFL's top 50 players (17th) of all-time in a poll conducted by Canadian sports network TSN in 2006. Barrow died February 17, 2015, at his home in Missouri City, Texas; he was 79 years old.

See also 

 1956 College Football All-America Team
 Florida Gators
 Florida Gators football, 1950–59
 List of Canadian Football Hall of Fame inductees
 List of Florida Gators football All-Americans
 List of University of Florida alumni
 List of University of Florida Athletic Hall of Fame members

References

Bibliography 
 Carlson, Norm, University of Florida Football Vault: The History of the Florida Gators, Whitman Publishing, LLC, Atlanta, Georgia (2007).  .
 Golenbock, Peter, Go Gators!  An Oral History of Florida's Pursuit of Gridiron Glory, Legends Publishing, LLC, St. Petersburg, Florida (2002).  .
 Hairston, Jack, Tales from the Gator Swamp: A Collection of the Greatest Gator Stories Ever Told, Sports Publishing, LLC, Champaign, Illinois (2002).  .
 McCarthy, Kevin M.,  Fightin' Gators: A History of University of Florida Football, Arcadia Publishing, Mount Pleasant, South Carolina (2000).  .
 McEwen, Tom, The Gators: A Story of Florida Football, The Strode Publishers, Huntsville, Alabama (1974).  .

External links 

  – Canadian Football Hall of Fame video biography of John Barrow

1935 births
2015 deaths
All-American college football players
American players of Canadian football
Canadian football defensive linemen
Canadian football offensive linemen
Canadian Football Hall of Fame inductees
Florida Gators football players
Hamilton Tiger-Cats players
Sportspeople from Delray Beach, Florida
Toronto Argonauts general managers